Gilanshah (Persian: گیلانشاه) was the last ruler of the Ziyarid dynasty from ca. 1087 to 1090. He was the son and successor of Keikavus. Little is known about Gilanshah; his kingdom was invaded by the Nizari Ismaili state in 1090, ending Ziyarid rule in Tabaristan.

Family tree

Sources
 
 
 

Ziyarid dynasty
11th-century monarchs in Asia
11th-century Iranian people